is a Japanese-American footballer who plays for Sagan Tosu.

Career
Born by the union of a Japanese father and an American mother of Turkish origin, Togashi was partially raised in New York City before moving to Japan with his family at the age of 6.  They settled in Yokohama. From a young age, he was associated with the Yokohama F. Marinos, the biggest club in his hometown. He was first a Special Designated Player in 2015, then he signed a full professional contract for 2016.

Club statistics
Updated to 16 September 2022.

International 

 Japan national under-23 football team
 2016 Toulon Tournament

References

External links

Profile at Yokohama F. Marinos 

1993 births
Living people
Soccer players from New York City
Japanese footballers
J1 League players
J2 League players
J3 League players
Yokohama F. Marinos players
FC Tokyo players
FC Tokyo U-23 players
FC Machida Zelvia players
V-Varen Nagasaki players
Vegalta Sendai players
American emigrants to Japan
American people of Japanese descent
American people of Turkish descent
Japanese people of Turkish descent
Association football forwards